East Stone Gap is an unincorporated community and census-designated place in Wise County, Virginia, United States. East Stone Gap is an eastern suburb of Big Stone Gap; U.S. Route 23 separates the two settlements. It was first listed as a CDP in the 2020 census with a population of 537. East Stone Gap has a post office with ZIP code 24246.

References

Unincorporated communities in Wise County, Virginia
Unincorporated communities in Virginia
Census-designated places in Wise County, Virginia
Census-designated places in Virginia